The 1953 Swedish speedway season was the 1953 season of motorcycle speedway in Sweden.

Individual

Individual Championship
The 1953 Swedish Individual Speedway Championship final was held on 2 October in Stockholm. Göran Norlén won the Swedish Championship.

Team

Team Championship
Vargarna won division 1 and were declared the winners of the Swedish Speedway Team Championship.

Vikingarna won division 2.

There were just 11 teams for the 1953 season following the demise of three teams; Knallarna, Garvarna	and Kavaljererna.

See also 
 Speedway in Sweden

References

Speedway leagues
Professional sports leagues in Sweden
Swedish
Seasons in Swedish speedway